Wendy Kay Wagner (born October 31, 1973) is an American former cross-country skier. She competed at the 2002 Winter Olympics and the 2006 Winter Olympics. After the Olympics, Wagner worked as an avalanche forecaster for the United States Forest Service.

Cross-country skiing results
All results are sourced from the International Ski Federation (FIS).

Olympic Games

World Championships

a.  Cancelled due to extremely cold weather.

World Cup

Season standings

References

External links
 

1973 births
Living people
American female cross-country skiers
Olympic cross-country skiers of the United States
Cross-country skiers at the 2002 Winter Olympics
Cross-country skiers at the 2006 Winter Olympics
Skiers from Salt Lake City
21st-century American women